Bruno Gregoretti (CP920) is a multipurpose vessel built for the Italian Coast Guard as an offshore patrol vessel.

The ship is optimised for offshore fishery patrolling, oil spill clean-up purposes and fire fighting. The most common duties are fishery inspections and search and rescues in the Mediterranean Sea.
The ship was ordered at a price of 15.5 million euros.

See also 
 Italian Coast Guard

References 

2011 ships
Patrol boats
Ships built in Naples
Corps of the Port Captaincies – Coast Guard